The Montreal Tapes: Tribute to Joe Henderson is a live album by the American jazz bassist Charlie Haden with saxophonist Joe Henderson and drummer Al Foster recorded at the Montreal International Jazz Festival in 1989 and released on the Verve label.

Reception 
The AllMusic review by Thom Jurek awarded the album 4 stars, stating, "This set is a powerful testament to the inherent musical communication of swing between three fine principals, and one of the best live trio dates issued in years".

Track listing 
 "'Round Midnight" (Thelonious Monk) - 12:00 
 "All the Things You Are (Oscar Hammerstein II, Jerome Kern) - 19:19 
 "In the Moment" (Charlie Haden) - 14:41 
 "Passport" (Charlie Parker) - 20:56 
Recorded at the Festival de Jazz de Montreal in Canada on June 30, 1989

Personnel
Charlie Haden – bass
Joe Henderson - tenor saxophone
Al Foster - drums

References 

Verve Records live albums
Charlie Haden live albums
2003 live albums